Onesquethaw Valley Historic District is a national historic district principally located at New Scotland in Albany County, New York. It includes 25 contributing buildings and three contributing archaeological sites.  In encompasses farmsteads and sites in part of the valley of Onesquethaw Creek, a tributary of Coeymans Creek. Most notable are eight 18th-century stone houses.  The archaeological sites are a grist mill site, sawmill site, and a prehistoric Indian site.

It was listed on the National Register of Historic Places in 1974.

References

Archaeological sites on the National Register of Historic Places in New York (state)
Historic districts on the National Register of Historic Places in New York (state)
Historic districts in Albany County, New York
National Register of Historic Places in Albany County, New York